Ortoire may refer to:
Ortoire (archaeological site), the archaeological type site for the Ortoiroid people
Ortoire Block, an oil and gas exploration area
Ortoire (village), a village in Mayaro County on Trinidad Island
Ortoire Municipal Corporation, a political subdivision of Mayaro–Rio Claro Regional Corporation
Ortoire River, a river on Trinidad and Tobago
Ortoire syncline, a geologic feature in Ortoire Block, an oil and gas exploration area in the Mayaro–Rio Claro region of Trinidad
Ortoire (ward), a section of Victoria County, Trinidad and Tobago

See also
Ortoiroid people